The Michael Mind Project is a German house DJ and music production duo consisting of Jens Kindervater and Frank Bülles. Formed in 2007 under the name Michael Mind, it took its current name in 2009 to avoid confusion and emphasize the fictional nature of the name.

Biography
In 2008, The Michael Mind Project released a track called "Show Me Love", a new version of the hit of Robin S. This track was a real success in Clubs, concerts and on YouTube as well.

Discography

Albums

Singles
As Michael Mind

As Michael Mind Project

References

External links
 

German house music groups
German DJs
German musical duos
Electronic dance music duos
Musical groups established in 2007
Spinnin' Records artists